Vuelta Grande Airport is a public use airport serving the Vuelta Grande gas recycling project in the Chuquisaca Department of Bolivia.

See also

Transport in Bolivia
List of airports in Bolivia

References

External links 
OpenStreetMap - Vuelta Grande
OurAirports - Vuelta Grande
Fallingrain - Vuelta Grande Airport

Airports in Chuquisaca Department